Javier Martín Musa (born January 15, 1979) is an Argentine former football player who played as centre back.

External links
 

1979 births
Living people
Association football defenders
Argentine footballers
Argentine expatriate footballers
C.S. Marítimo players
Leça F.C. players
Suwon Samsung Bluewings players
Ulsan Hyundai FC players
Beijing Guoan F.C. players
Chinese Super League players
Argentine Primera División players
Primeira Liga players
K League 1 players
Expatriate footballers in Portugal
Expatriate footballers in South Korea
Argentine expatriate sportspeople in South Korea
Footballers from Buenos Aires
Expatriate footballers in China